Monterrey Municipality is one of the 51 subdivisions of the State of Nuevo León, Mexico. Its municipal seat is located in the City of Monterrey.

The municipal government is headed by the municipal president of Monterrey (mayor of Monterrey).

References

External links

.
Municipalities of Nuevo León